Léon Bouffard (24 June 1893 in Geneva, Switzerland – 23 July 1981 in Geneva, Switzerland) was a Swiss athlete and sports administrator. As an athlete, he competed in pole vault, winning the Swiss championship in 1914. He was the founder (in 1929) and president of the Swiss Basketball Federation. He co-founded FIBA in 1932 and served as FIBA's president from 1932 to 1948. He organized 1st European Basketball Championship in 1935 and 4th European Basketball Championship in 1946, both in Geneva. Since 1948 he served as the Honorary President of FIBA. In 2007, he was enshrined as a contributor into the FIBA Hall of Fame.

External links 
 FIBA Hall of Fame page on Bouffard

1893 births
1981 deaths
Sportspeople from Geneva
FIBA Hall of Fame inductees
Basketball in Switzerland